The Roman Catholic Diocese of Governador Valadares is a diocese located in the city of Governador Valadares in the Ecclesiastical province of Mariana in Brazil.

History
On 1 February 1956 Pope Pius XII established the Diocese of Governador Valadares from the Diocese of Araçuaí, the Diocese of Caratinga and the Metropolitan Archdiocese of Diamantina.

Bishops
 Bishops of Governador Valadares (Latin Church)
Hermínio Malzone Hugo (1957.01.29 – 1977.12.07) 
José Gonçalves Heleno (1977.12.07 – 2001.04.25)
Werner Franz Siebenbrock, S.V.D. (2001.12.19 – 2014.03.06)
Antônio Carlos Félix (2014.03.06 -

Other priest of this diocese who became bishop
Emanuel Messias de Oliveira, appointed Bishop of Guanhães in 1998

References

Roman Catholic dioceses in Brazil
Christian organizations established in 1956
Governador Valadares, Roman Catholic Diocese of
Roman Catholic dioceses and prelatures established in the 20th century